The 2021–22 Oklahoma Sooners women's basketball team represented the University of Oklahoma in the 2021–22 NCAA Division I women's basketball season. The Sooners were led by first year head coach Jennie Baranczyk who appointed in April 2021. The team played its home games at the Lloyd Noble Center in Norman, Oklahoma was a member of the Big 12 Conference.

Previous season

The Sooners finished the previous season 12–12, 9–9 in Big 12 play, to finish in sixth place. At the Big 12 Tournament Sooners lost against Oklahoma State 80–89 in overtime.

Offseason

Departures

Additions

Recruits

2021 recruiting class

2022 recruiting class

Roster

Schedule

Source:

|-
!colspan=9 style=| Exhibition

|-
!colspan=9 style=| Non-conference regular season (11-1)

|-
!colspan=9 style=| Big 12 regular season (12-6)

|-
!colspan=9 style=| Big 12 Women's Tournament (1-1)

|-
!colspan=9 style=|NCAA tournament (1-1)

Rankings 

Coaches' Poll did not release a second poll at the same time as the AP.

See also
 2021–22 Oklahoma Sooners men's basketball team

References

2021-22
2021–22 Big 12 Conference women's basketball season
2021 in sports in Oklahoma
2022 in sports in Oklahoma
Oklahoma